Jonathan David Nurse (born 28 March 1981) is a Barbadian football coach and former professional footballer who is a first-team coach at Southern Football League club Metropolitan Police.

Nurse began his career at Sutton United in 2003, spending a season with the club before signing for Stevenage Borough ahead of the 2004–05 season. During the season, he was loaned out to Conference South club Lewes, before returning to his parent club and being part of the team that narrowly missed out on promotion to the Football League. He spent two further seasons at Stevenage, winning the FA Trophy during the 2006–07 season. At the start of that season, Nurse was briefly loaned out to Woking.

He eventually moved into the Football League with newly promoted Dagenham & Redbridge in May 2007. He spent five seasons at Dagenham, notably scoring the winning goal in the League Two play-off final in May 2010 as the club secured promotion to League One. He signed for League Two team Barnet on a free transfer ahead of the 2012–13 season. Nurse spent three years at Barnet, culminating in helping the club win promotion back to the Football League during the 2014–15 season under the new role of player-coach. He then signed for Isthmian League club Metropolitan Police in the summer of 2015 and was appointed player-coach in December 2015. Nurse also represented his native Barbados at international level, earning six caps.

Early life
Nurse was born in Bridgetown, Barbados, and moved to England in 1984, taking up residence in Fulham living with his grandparents and mother.

Club career

Early career
Nurse began playing football for Malden Vale under-13s, before representing Wallington Wanderers until the age of 17. During this period, he had unsuccessful trials at both Crystal Palace and Wimbledon. Nurse joined Morden and District League team Sutton Athletic of Sunday league football. He stated that he "went on to score lots of goals and was lucky enough to appear in a number of finals and promotion winning teams", as well as saying it was during this time that he "really learnt how to play football". In 2002, he joined Nuwood of the Surrey South Eastern Combination, and after impressing that season, he subsequently signed for Sutton United. After playing in the reserve team at the start of the 2003–04 season, scoring regularly, he earned a call-up to the first-team in October 2003. His first start for Sutton was a game against Basingstoke Town, and he scored his first goal shortly after in a 1–0 away victory at Kettering Town. The goal served as the catalyst for a run of eight goals in as many games, scoring in eight consecutive matches. He went on to score 19 times in 28 games that season. During the season, he had spent time on trial at Colchester United, who invited him back for a second trial, as well as speaking to Wimbledon about a potential trial.

Stevenage Borough
Nurse spoke to Stevenage Borough manager Graham Westley at the end of the season, and agreed to sign for the club on 12 June 2004. On his move to play in the highest tier of non-league football, Nurse stated – "Graham sold himself firstly and then told me how I would fit in. He then invited me to the stadium and that was all I needed. I had gone from the parks to Sutton United and then seeing Broadhall Way I didn’t need any more convincing. I had the perfect platform to further my career. The ground and training ground were that impressive I wanted to sign straight away". He made his debut for the club on the opening day of the 2004–05 season, playing the whole match as Stevenage lost 3–1 to Dagenham & Redbridge. Nurse's first goal for the club came in his sixth appearance on 21 September 2004, scoring the second in a 3–0 win over Farnborough Town at Cherrywood Road. Nurse found first-team appearances hard to come by due to a number of injuries, and in January 2005, he joined Conference South team Lewes on a loan deal. He made his debut for Lewes in a 3–2 victory over Hayes on 29 January 2005, and scored his first goals for the club as they defeated Havant & Waterlooville 3–1 at The Dripping Pan. After scoring three times in seven matches at Lewes, he returned to Stevenage, and subsequently regained his first-team place from March 2005 onwards. He played in all of the games in Stevenage's run-in as the club made the Conference National play-offs, and came on as a second-half substitute as Stevenage lost 1–0 to Carlisle United in the play-off final at the Britannia Stadium. During his first season with the club, he scored three times in 22 matches.

Nurse was a regular throughout the 2005–06 season. He was used on both the right wing and as a striker during the season. Nurse played in Stevenage's first game of the season, a 3–0 home victory over Altrincham. His first goal of the season came in late September 2005, scoring a consolation strike with Stevenage already three goals down in an eventual 4–1 defeat to Morecambe at Christie Park. Nurse went on to add a further four goals to his tally during the second half of the season, finishing the season with nine goals as Stevenage missed out on the play-off places. He was runner-up to goalkeeper Alan Julian in the club's Player of the Year awards ceremony.

Under the new management of Mark Stimson for the 2006–07 season, Nurse signed a new two-year contract on 6 June 2006. Having returned from a double hernia operation, he was loaned out for a month to fellow Conference National club Woking on 25 August 2006, in order to regain his fitness. He played regularly during his time at the Surrey-based club, scoring two goals in eight games, and Woking manager Glenn Cockerill wished to extend the loan agreement. However, Stimson rejected the request, and recalled Nurse from his loan spell on 26 September 2006. Four days later, Nurse played as a second-half substitute in the club's 2–1 home victory over Halifax Town, and scored a week later in a 2–2 draw away at Rushden & Diamonds. Nurse described the goal as "one of his favourite goals" as it was his first since his return from Woking. Nurse scored ten times during the season, and played regularly in Stevenage's run to the FA Trophy final, scoring two goals in six games as the club made the first competitive cup final at the new Wembley Stadium. He was an unused substitute in the final as Stevenage came from two goals down to beat Kidderminster Harriers. During his time at Stevenage, Nurse made 104 appearances, scoring 22 times.

Dagenham & Redbridge
In May 2007, Nurse signed for newly promoted League Two club Dagenham & Redbridge, signing a two-year contract. On signing Nurse, Dagenham manager John Still stated he had previously enquired about signing Nurse in January 2007 as a replacement for Craig Mackail-Smith. Nurse described his move as an opportunity that he could not turn down, owing to Dagenham's new Football League status, although he noted it was "a sad farewell" leaving Stevenage. He made his debut for Dagenham in the club's first Football League fixture on 11 August 2007, playing the whole match as they lost 1–0 to Stockport County at Edgeley Park. Nurse had to wait four months to score his first goal for the club, and it came in a 5–2 FA Cup defeat to Southend United on 5 January 2008, with Nurse's goal briefly restoring parity in the first-half. He scored his first league goal as Dagenham produced an "emphatic performance" in a 6–2 victory over Chester City on 12 February 2008. He made 35 appearances during Dagenham's first season in the Football League, scoring two goals, as the club consolidated their place in League Two with a 20th-placed finish.

He made his first appearance of the 2008–09 season in Dagenham's first game of the season, coming on as a late substitute in a 6–0 home win over Chester City. Nurse scored his first goal of the season on 21 October 2008, again appearing as a second-half substitute and halving the deficit as Dagenham lost 2–1 away to AFC Bournemouth. He was praised by teammate Ben Strevens after the match – "He doesn't get the credit for the way he plays. You know what you get from him. I can't say enough good things about him". Nurse made most of his appearances during the season as a substitute, playing in 39 matches, 18 of which starting, scoring four times. Dagenham missed out on one of the play-off places after finishing a point behind seventh placed Shrewsbury Town. Nurse signed a one-year contract extension on 30 June 2009, thus keeping him contracted to the club until the summer of 2010.

Nurse started the 2009–10 season by scoring three goals in as many games as Dagenham were positioned in first place in the League Two table during the early stages. Nurse scored three times towards the latter stages of the season as Dagenham were contesting to make the League Two play-offs. A goal in a 2–0 away victory against Darlington on 8 May 2010 helped the club secure a place in the play-offs following a seventh-place finish. Nurse played in both semi-final matches as the club beat Morecambe by a 7–2 aggregate scoreline. He started in the play-off final against Rotherham United on 30 May 2010, played at Wembley Stadium, and scored the winning goal in the 70th-minute as Dagenham secured promotion to League One for the first time in their 18-year history. Nurse's goal, the third in a 3–2 victory, came with the game tied at two-all, when the ball "dropped invitingly to him after Rotherham failed to clear a corner and his deflected strike came off Ellison and eluded Warrington". He scored eight times in 43 appearances during the season. With his contract expiring days after the promotion into the third tier of English football, Nurse signed a new two-year contract that would keep him contracted to Dagenham until May 2012.

Nurse played in Dagenham's first League One fixture during the 2010–11 season, coming on as a 65th-minute substitute in a 2–0 away defeat to Sheffield Wednesday at Hillsborough on 7 August 2010. He scored his first goal of the season with an injury-time strike in a 2–2 away draw at Charlton Athletic on 25 September 2010; Nurse's goal came in the third minute of additional time, heading in Damian Scannell's centre. It was to be his only goal during the first six months of the season. He ended his goal drought on 1 February 2011, scoring twice as Dagenham defeated Brentford 4–1 at Victoria Road, meaning the club moved off the bottom of League One. The two goals served as the catalyst for a run of goals for the remainder of the season; scoring the winning goals in home victories over Yeovil Town and Charlton Athletic, as well as scoring in games against Bournemouth and Swindon Town. Two goals in a 3–0 home victory over Carlisle United on the penultimate game of the season meant that Dagenham would go into the last game of the season needing to get at least a point away to Peterborough United, and hope results go their way, to avoid relegation. Nurse started as Dagenham were beaten 5–0 away to Peterborough, meaning the club would return to League Two. Nurse scored ten times in 28 starts, making a further 14 appearances as a substitute.

Back in League Two for the 2011–12 season, Nurse was a regular starter as Dagenham won three of their first four league matches, which included Nurse scoring the winning goal in a 1–0 win against Bradford City at Valley Parade on 20 August 2011. He scored in the club's 3–2 victory over Rotherham United on 28 January 2012, in what was a repeat scoreline of the play-off final in 2010. It ultimately turned out to be Nurse's last goal for the club. His last game for Dagenham was a 1–0 away victory over Port Vale on 31 March 2012, as his season was cut short due to injury. He made 46 appearances during the season, starting 43, and scored eight times. In May 2012, Nurse was released by Dagenham when his contract expired, ending his five-year association with the East London club. He made 205 appearances during his time at the club, scoring 32 goals. On his departure, Nurse said – "I sat down with John Still at the end of the 2011–12 season and was told that the club had to cut the budget and that unless they could get players off the wage bill I wouldn't be offered a new contract".

Barnet
Following his release from Dagenham, Nurse signed for League Two club Barnet on a free transfer on 19 July 2012. He scored a goal on his debut, briefly giving Barnet the lead in a League Cup tie away to Birmingham City, scoring courtesy of a header from Jordan Brown's cross. He scored his first league goal in a 3–1 home defeat to York City on 25 August 2012. He played eleven times during the second half of the season, taking his appearance tally to 28 for the season, as Barnet were ultimately relegated to the Conference Premier. At the end of the season, in June 2013, Nurse was placed on the transfer-list by Barnet.

Despite being transfer-listed, Nurse remained at Barnet for the 2013–14 season. He did not play in the opening two months of the season, eventually making his first appearance of the season as an 88th-minute substitute in a 1–0 away victory over Hereford United on 19 October 2013. His first start of the season came in the Herts Senior Cup, scoring twice in a 4–1 win over Hatfield Town on 3 December 2013. The two goals served as the catalyst for a run of four goals in three games as Nurse scored his first league goal of the season in Barnet's 1–0 win over Dartford four days later. He made two brief substitute appearances on his return from a three-match suspension before being loaned out to Conference South club Farnborough on a one-month deal on 31 January 2014. Nurse scored on his Farnborough debut in a 3–2 win over Dorchester Town a day after signing. Having scored one goal in five appearances during the loan agreement, Barnet recalled him early on 27 February 2014, due to a number of injuries to their attacking options. He started playing regularly after the arrival of Martin Allen as manager, but at the end of the season, having made 19 appearances during the season, scoring twice, Nurse was included in Barnet's list of released players. However, on 16 May 2014, he re-signed for Barnet as a player-coach, Allen citing Nurse's UEFA 'B' Licence as one of the reasons for keeping him on.

In his new role as player-coach for the 2014–15 season, Nurse played a largely peripheral role on the playing side, making 11 appearances during the season, of which five were starting appearances, with his coaching role taking on more importance as he was described as "an integral part of the coaching set-up during the season". Barnet were promoted back to League Two at the end of the season after winning the Conference Premier title and Nurse was named as Clubman of the Year for the season at the Player of the Year awards event. In June 2015, he left Barnet by mutual consent to concentrate on his coaching career.

Metropolitan Police
Following his departure from Barnet, Nurse joined Isthmian League club Metropolitan Police for the 2015–16 season. Prior to him signing for Met Police in a playing capacity, he was already head coach for their youth system up to under-16 level. He made his debut for Met Police in a 3–1 home defeat to Wingate & Finchley on 31 August 2015. Nurse scored his first goal in their next match, a 1–0 away win at former club Farnborough on 5 September 2015. In December 2015, Nurse was appointed as first-team coach at Met Police, with his focus shifting to coaching whilst providing cover as a player if needed. This was the case, with Nurse being able to focus on his new role as first-team coach, although he did play in the first-team again in March 2016 through to April 2016, making four second-half substitute appearances during a particularly congested period. He made twelve appearances during the season, scoring twice. During that season, Nurse also played occasionally for Southern Combination Football League club Loxwood. Loxwood were managed by Mark Beard, who had previously played alongside Nurse at Stevenage. He played for Loxwood for free.

It was not initially disclosed whether Nurse would continue in his playing role going into the 2016–17 season and he did not play in any of Met Police's matches in the opening two months of the season. However, he appeared as an 86th-minute substitute in a match away at Havant & Waterlooville on 18 October 2016, scoring the winning goal in injury-time in a 2–1 win. This proved to be one of two appearances Nurse would make during the season, his other appearance also coming from the substitutes' bench in a 4–1 victory over Burgess Hill Town on 18 February 2017. He made three substitute appearances in the opening months of the 2017–18 season.

International career

Nurse was called up to represent Barbados in the early stages of 2008, and went on to make his debut in their 2010 FIFA World Cup qualifying match against Dominica on 16 February 2008, with Nurse playing 55 minutes in a 1–1 draw in Roseau. The forward then earned his second cap a month later when he played 69 minutes in the second leg against Dominica in Bridgetown on 26 March 2008, which Barbados won 1–0 to qualify for the Second Round of qualification. They faced the United States in the Second Round, and Nurse was once again called up to play in both fixtures in June 2008. He started in the first leg, playing the first 76 minutes as Barbados lost 8–0 at The Home Depot Center. A week later, on 22 June 2008, he played 80 minutes as they lost the home leg 1–0.

Nurse did not play again for Barbados for another three years, but was called up for two 2014 FIFA World Cup qualification games in September 2011. He earned his fifth cap in a 2–0 away loss to Guyana on 2 September 2011, a match in which his brother Chris was playing for Guyana. Four days later, on 6 September, he played the whole match as Barbados lost 2–0 to Trinidad and Tobago at the Barbados National Stadium, which turned out to be his last appearance for his country.

Coaching career
Nurse holds a UEFA 'B' coaching licence. He first went into coaching as Head of Youth at Metropolitan Police, coaching up to under-16 level. He became first-team coach at Barnet ahead of the 2014–15 season, a season in which they would secure the Conference Premier title. After leaving Barnet at the end of that season, Nurse was appointed first-team coach at Met Police in December 2015. Alongside his coaching role at Met Police, Nurse is also a coach for the Love The Ball (LTB) Academy in Sussex, an academy set up by former Stevenage teammate Mark Beard.

Personal life
Nurse has a younger brother, Chris, who is also a professional footballer, with the pair playing in the same team during their time at Sutton United.

Career statistics

Club

A.  The "League" column constitutes appearances and goals (including those as a substitute) in the Isthmian League, Football Conference and Football League.
B.  The "Other" column constitutes appearances and goals (including those as a substitute) in the Conference League Cup, FA Trophy, Football League Trophy, Conference National play-offs and Football League play-offs.

International

Honours
Stevenage Borough
FA Trophy: 2006–07

Dagenham & Redbridge
League Two play-offs: 2009–10

Barnet
Conference Premier: 2014–15

References

External links

1981 births
Living people
Sportspeople from Bridgetown
Barbadian footballers
Barbados international footballers
Association football forwards
Sutton United F.C. players
Stevenage F.C. players
Lewes F.C. players
Woking F.C. players
Dagenham & Redbridge F.C. players
Barnet F.C. players
Barnet F.C. non-playing staff
Farnborough F.C. players
Metropolitan Police F.C. players
Loxwood F.C. players
English Football League players
National League (English football) players
Isthmian League players
Alumni of Middlesex University
Barbadian emigrants to England